Marble Valley may refer to:

Marble Valley, Alabama, unincorporated community
Marble Valley Regional Transit District Rutland County, Vermont 
Marble Valley, Marble Mountains (Siskiyou County), Northern California
Marble Valley (band)